"Knives Out" is a song by the English rock band Radiohead, released as the second single from their fifth album, Amnesiac (2001). It features lyrics about cannibalism and guitars influenced by the Smiths. "Knives Out" received positive reviews and reached number 13 on the UK Singles Chart and number one on the Canadian Singles Chart. The music video was directed by Michel Gondry.

Recording 
Radiohead recorded "Knives Out" between 1999 and 2000 during the sessions for their albums Kid A and Amnesiac, which were recorded simultaneously. In November 1999, they performed "Knives Out" during a webcast from their studio.

According to a studio diary kept by the guitarist Ed O'Brien, "Knives Out" took 373 days to complete. He wrote that it was "probably the most straight-ahead thing we've done in years ... and that might explain why we took so long on it". He felt that successful bands often over-embellish their music, especially songs written on acoustic guitar, but that Radiohead had captured the song's essence. 

"Knives Out" was influenced by the British rock band the Smiths. Before its release, O'Brien played it for the Smiths guitarist Johnny Marr, who said: "I was beyond flattered and quite speechless – which takes some doing. He explained to me that with that song they'd tried to take a snapshot of the way I'd done things in the Smiths – and I guess you can hear that in it."

Composition 
According to Drowned in Sound, "Knives Out" is the most conventional song on Amnesiac. It features "chiming" and "drifting" guitar lines, "driving" percussion, a "wandering" bassline, "haunting" vocals and "eerie" lyrics. The singer, Thom Yorke, said the lyrics were about cannibalism. He said: "It's partly the idea of the businessman walking out on his wife and kids and never coming back. It's also the thousand-yard stare when you look at someone close to you and you know they're gonna die."

Music video 
The "Knives Out" music video was directed by Michel Gondry. Gondry was going through a breakup at the time, and expressed his feelings in the video concept, which has Yorke grieving in a hospital room. Gondry described the collaboration as a "terrible experience", and said: "I showed [Yorke] a storyboard and every single detail: he was completely excited and happy for it – and then, it turned out, they all criticise me for being selfish and putting my own views on it and my own introspection ... It did not go smoothly, but if it went smoothly, it would be mediocre."

Release 
In the United Kingdom, "Knives Out" was released on 6 August 2001 as the second Amnesiac single in three formats: two CD singles and a 12-inch vinyl single. It reached number 13 on the UK Singles Chart.

"Knives Out" was covered by the Flaming Lips on their 2003 EP Fight Test, the pianist Christopher O'Riley on his 2003 album True Love Waits, and the jazz pianist Brad Mehldau on his 2006 album Day is Done. The 2019 film Knives Out takes its name from the song; the director, Rian Johnson, a Radiohead fan, said: "Obviously, the movie has nothing to do with the song ... That turn of phrase has always stuck in my head."

Reception 
David Merryweather of Drowned in Sound gave the "Knives Out" single nine out of ten, praising Jonny Greenwood's "chiming" guitar for capturing the "romantic disappointment" and "wistful ache" of the Smiths. Reviewing Amnesiac for Pitchfork, Ryan Schreiber felt the guitar line was too similar to Radiohead's 1997 song "Paranoid Android", writing: "Great melody. However, they've fucking used it before." 

In 2010, Consequence of Sound praised "Knives Out" as one of Radiohead's "creepiest" songs: "It’s one of many tracks from the English quintet that tickles the bones rather than warms them. But that’s what makes Radiohead so unique." In 2020, the Guardian named it the 13th-best Radiohead song, writing: "The impenetrable Amnesiac debunked industry rumours that Radiohead were primed for a bankable comeback – but amid that album lay this meat-and-potatoes rocker, its scurrying riffs, mystic ambience and cannibalistic lyrics qualifying as glorious light relief."

Track listings 
All tracks written by Radiohead.

UK CD1 and 12-inch single (CDFHEIS 45103; 12FHEIT 45103)
 "Knives Out" – 4:17
 "Cuttooth" – 5:24
 "Life in a Glasshouse" (full length version) – 5:06UK CD2 (CDFHEIT 45103) "Knives Out" – 4:17
 "Worrywort" – 4:37
 "Fog" – 4:05European maxi-CD and Australasian CD single (7243 8 79760 2 3) "Knives Out" – 4:17
 "Worrywort" – 4:37
 "Fog" – 4:04
 "Life in a Glasshouse" (full length version) – 5:06US enhanced maxi-CD single (C2 7243 8 77668 0 8) "Knives Out" – 4:17
 "Cuttooth" – 5:24
 "Life in a Glasshouse" (full length version) – 5:06
 "Pyramid Song" (enhanced video) – 5:05Japanese CD single (TOCP-65871)'''
 "Knives Out" – 4:17
 "Cuttooth" – 5:25
 "Worrywort" – 4:37
 "Fog" – 4:05
 "Life in a Glasshouse" (full length version) – 5:06

Charts

Weekly charts

Year-end charts

Release history

References

External links 
 "Knives Out" video at YouTube
 Article about the video

Radiohead songs
2000 songs
2001 singles
Canadian Singles Chart number-one singles
Capitol Records singles
EMI Records singles
Music videos directed by Michel Gondry
Parlophone singles
Songs about cannibalism
Song recordings produced by Nigel Godrich
Songs written by Thom Yorke
Songs written by Colin Greenwood
Songs written by Jonny Greenwood
Songs written by Philip Selway
Songs written by Ed O'Brien